Laetitia Bataille is a French journalist and author, specializing in equestrianism. She received classical riding instruction and has practised dressage, show jumping, eventing, carriage driving, horse breeding and long-distance trekking. She was well known as a long distance trekking rider, achieving with her husband Jacques Bataille several long trips on horseback. She is a certified Equestrian Tourism Guide (GTE). She taught riding (especially sidesaddle) in Paris at the Etrier Riding School for several years.

Publications 
Laetitia Bataille has written thousands of articles issued in various equestrian magazines. She is also the author of 14 books or booklets on horses. In 2009, she launched her own horse magazine, Cheval Savoir (“horse knowledge”) published on the Internet with articles in both French and English.

Races équines de France, France Agricole Éditions, Paris, 2008 
Les poneys: races et élevage, France Agricole Éditions, Paris, 2007, 
La monture pour enfants: Choix, préparation, entretien, 2006
Le lusitanien, 2004
La mule poitevine, 2004
L'équitation, Aedis, 2003
Le pure race espagnole, 2002
Le cheval, Aedis, 2002
Cheval : problèmes et solutions, 2001
J'élève mes poneys, Maloine, 1994
Choix du cheval de randonnée, Equilivres, 1993
À bon port, en bon état, Prest édit, 1984

References 

Living people
French female equestrians
Year of birth missing (living people)